Lists of bodies of water include:

Seawater bodies 

 List of bodies of water by salinity
 List of oceans
 List of seas
 List of gulfs
 Lists of bays
 List of gulfs
 List of bays and coves of Jamaica
 List of bays in Hong Kong
 List of bays in the Azores
 List of bays of Dominica
 List of bays of South Africa
 List of bays of the British Isles
 List of bays of the Philippines
 List of bays of the United States
 List of bays of Florida
 List of bays of Maine
 List of bays of the Houston area
 Lists of fjords
 List of fjords in Canada
 List of fjords, channels, sounds and straits of Chile
 List of Norwegian fjords
 List of fjords of Greenland
 List of fjords of Iceland
 List of fiords of New Zealand
 List of fjords of the United States
 List of straits

Brackish water bodies 

 List of brackish bodies of water

Fresh water bodies 

 Reservoirs
 List of reservoirs by surface area
 List of reservoirs by volume
 Lists of rivers

Lakes 

List of lakes
 List of lakes by area
 List of lakes by depth
 List of lakes by volume

Lakes, by region 

 List of lakes and lochs of the United Kingdom
 List of lakes and reservoirs – Mogollon Rim – Mogollon Plateau
 List of lakes in Aust-Agder
 List of lakes in Bavaria
 List of lakes in Bucharest
 List of lakes in Greater Sudbury
 List of lakes in Himachal Pradesh
 List of lakes in Jyväskylä
 List of lakes in Kentucky
 List of lakes in Kosovo
 List of lakes in Schleswig-Holstein
 List of lakes in Tamil Nadu
 List of lakes in Yoho National Park
 List of lakes in the Alpine Lakes Wilderness
 List of lakes in the Lake District
 List of lakes named Diamond
 List of lakes named Fish Lake
 List of lakes named Paw Paw Lake
 List of lakes named Rocky Lake in Nova Scotia
 List of lakes named Summit Lake in British Columbia
 List of lakes named Timber Lake
 List of lakes of Albania
 List of lakes of Argentina
 List of lakes of Australia
 List of lakes of Western Australia, A–C
 List of lakes of Western Australia, D–K
 List of lakes of Western Australia, L–P
 List of lakes of Western Australia, Q–Z
 List of lakes of Austria
 List of lakes of Azerbaijan
 List of lakes of Belgium
 List of lakes of Bolivia
 List of lakes of Bosnia and Herzegovina
 List of lakes of Brazil
 List of lakes of Bulgaria
 List of lakes of Burkina Faso
 List of lakes of Burundi
 List of lakes of Cambodia
 List of lakes of Canada
 List of lakes of Alberta
 List of lakes of British Columbia
 List of lakes of Manitoba
 List of lakes of New Brunswick
 List of lakes of Nova Scotia
 List of lakes of Nunavut
 List of lakes of Ontario
 List of lakes of Quebec
 List of lakes of Saskatchewan
 List of lakes of Yukon
 List of lakes of Chad
 List of lakes of Chile
 List of lakes of China
 List of lakes of Croatia
 List of lakes of Denmark
 List of lakes of Egypt
 List of lakes of Estonia
 List of lakes of Ethiopia
 List of lakes of Finland
 List of lakes of France
 List of lakes of Georgia (country)
 List of lakes of Germany
 List of lakes of Greece
 List of lakes of Guatemala
 List of lakes of Hong Kong
 List of lakes of Hungary
 List of lakes of Iceland
 List of lakes of India
 List of lakes of Indonesia
 List of lakes of Israel
 List of lakes of Italy
 List of lakes of Japan
 List of lakes of Kazakhstan
 List of lakes of Kenya
 List of lakes of Korea
 List of lakes of Lithuania
 List of lakes of Malaysia
 List of lakes of Mexico
 List of lakes of Mongolia
 List of lakes of Montenegro
 List of lakes of Nepal
 List of lakes of New Zealand
 List of lakes of Newfoundland and Labrador
 List of lakes of Norway
 List of lakes of Pakistan
 List of lakes of Papua New Guinea
 List of lakes of Peru
 List of lakes of Poland
 List of lakes of Portugal
 List of lakes of Puerto Rico
 List of lakes of Romania
 List of lakes of Russia
 List of lakes of Rwanda
 List of lakes of Serbia
 List of lakes of Slovenia
 List of lakes of South Africa
 List of lakes of South Ossetia
 List of lakes of Sweden
 List of lakes of Switzerland
 List of lakes of Taiwan
 List of lakes of Tanzania
 List of lakes of Turkey
 List of lakes of Turkmenistan
 List of lakes of Uganda
 List of lakes of Uzbekistan
 List of lakes of Vietnam
 List of lakes of Zambia
 List of lakes of the Cook Islands
 List of lakes of the Czech Republic
 List of lakes of the Democratic Republic of the Congo
 List of lakes of the Faroe Islands
 List of lakes of the Kerguelen Islands
 List of lakes of the LCRV (birdwatching)
 List of lakes of the Netherlands
 List of lakes of the Northwest Territories
 List of lakes of the Palestinian territories
 List of lakes of the Philippines
 List of lakes of the Sawtooth Mountains (Idaho)
 List of lakes of the St. Johns River
 List of lakes of the United Kingdom
 List of lakes of England
 List of lakes of Wales
 List of lakes of the United States
 List of lakes in Alabama
 List of lakes of Alaska
 List of lakes in Arizona
 List of lakes in Arkansas
 List of lakes in Arkansas County, Arkansas
 List of lakes in Ashley County, Arkansas
 List of lakes in Baxter County, Arkansas
 List of lakes in Benton County, Arkansas
 List of lakes in Boone County, Arkansas
 List of lakes in Bradley County, Arkansas
 List of lakes in Calhoun County, Arkansas
 List of lakes in Carroll County, Arkansas
 List of lakes in Chicot County, Arkansas
 List of lakes in Clark County, Arkansas
 List of lakes in Clay County, Arkansas
 List of lakes in Cleburne County, Arkansas
 List of lakes in Cleveland County, Arkansas
 List of lakes in Columbia County, Arkansas
 List of lakes in Conway County, Arkansas
 List of lakes in Craighead County, Arkansas
 List of lakes in Crawford County, Arkansas
 List of lakes in Crittenden County, Arkansas
 List of lakes in Cross County, Arkansas
 List of lakes in Dallas County, Arkansas
 List of lakes in Desha County, Arkansas
 List of lakes in Drew County, Arkansas
 List of lakes in Faulkner County, Arkansas
 List of lakes in Franklin County, Arkansas
 List of lakes in Fulton County, Arkansas
 List of lakes in Garland County, Arkansas
 List of lakes in Grant County, Arkansas
 List of lakes in Hot Spring County, Arkansas
 List of lakes in Howard County, Arkansas
 List of lakes in Independence County, Arkansas
 List of lakes in Izard County, Arkansas
 List of lakes in Jackson County, Arkansas
 List of lakes in Jefferson County, Arkansas
 List of lakes in Johnson County, Arkansas
 List of lakes in Lafayette County, Arkansas
 List of lakes in Lawrence County, Arkansas
 List of lakes in Lee County, Arkansas
 List of lakes in Lincoln County, Arkansas
 List of lakes in Little River County, Arkansas
 List of lakes in Logan County, Arkansas
 List of lakes in Lonoke County, Arkansas
 List of lakes in Madison County, Arkansas
 List of lakes in Marion County, Arkansas
 List of lakes in Washington County, Arkansas
 List of lakes in California
 List of lakes in Lake County, California
 List of lakes in the San Francisco Bay Area
 List of lakes in Colorado
 List of lakes in Illinois
 List of lakes in Indiana
 List of lakes, reservoirs, and dams in Kansas
 List of lakes in Maine
 List of lakes in Minnesota
 List of lakes in Minneapolis
 List of lakes in Michigan
 List of lakes in Montana
 List of lakes in Beaverhead County, Montana
 List of lakes in Big Horn County, Montana
 List of lakes in Blaine County, Montana
 List of lakes in Broadwater County, Montana
 List of lakes in Carbon County, Montana
 List of lakes in Carter County, Montana
 List of lakes in Cascade County, Montana
 List of lakes in Chouteau County, Montana
 List of lakes in Custer County, Montana
 List of lakes in Daniels County, Montana
 List of lakes in Dawson County, Montana
 List of lakes in Deer Lodge County, Montana
 List of lakes in Fallon County, Montana
 List of lakes in Fergus County, Montana
 List of lakes in Gallatin County, Montana
 List of lakes in Garfield County, Montana
 List of lakes in Golden Valley County, Montana
 List of lakes in Granite County, Montana
 List of lakes in Flathead County, Montana (A-L)
 List of lakes in Flathead County, Montana (M-Z)
 List of lakes in Glacier County, Montana
 List of lakes in Greene County, Arkansas
 List of lakes in Hempstead County, Arkansas
 List of lakes in Hill County, Montana
 List of lakes in Jefferson County, Montana
 List of lakes in Judith Basin County, Montana
 List of lakes in Lewis and Clark County, Montana
 List of lakes in Liberty County, Montana
 List of lakes in Lincoln County, Montana
 List of lakes in Madison County, Montana
 List of lakes in Lake County, Montana
 List of lakes in McCone County, Montana
 List of lakes in Meagher County, Montana
 List of lakes in Mineral County, Montana
 List of lakes in Missoula County, Montana
 List of lakes in Musselshell County, Montana
 List of lakes in Park County, Montana
 List of lakes in Petroleum County, Montana
 List of lakes in Phillips County, Montana
 List of lakes in Pondera County, Montana
 List of lakes in Powder River County, Montana
 List of lakes in Powell County, Montana
 List of lakes in Prairie County, Montana
 List of lakes in Ravalli County, Montana
 List of lakes in Richland County, Montana
 List of lakes in Roosevelt County, Montana
 List of lakes in Rosebud County, Montana
 List of lakes in Sanders County, Montana
 List of lakes in Sheridan County, Montana
 List of lakes in Silver Bow County, Montana
 List of lakes in Stillwater County, Montana
 List of lakes in Sweet Grass County, Montana
 List of lakes in Teton County, Montana
 List of lakes in Toole County, Montana
 List of lakes in Treasure County, Montana
 List of lakes in Valley County, Montana (A-L)
 List of lakes in Valley County, Montana (M-Z)
 List of lakes in Wheatland County, Montana
 List of lakes in Wibaux County, Montana
 List of lakes in Yellowstone County, Montana
 List of lakes in Nebraska
 List of lakes in New Hampshire
 List of lakes in New York
 List of lakes in Ohio
 List of lakes in Oklahoma
 List of lakes in Oregon
 List of lakes in Pennsylvania
 List of lakes in Rhode Island
 List of lakes in South Carolina
 List of lakes in South Dakota
 List of lakes in Texas
 List of lakes in Utah
 List of lakes in Virginia
 List of lakes of Washington (state)
 List of lakes in West Virginia
 List of lakes in Wisconsin
 List of lakes in Marinette County, Wisconsin
 List of lakes in Oneida County, Wisconsin
 List of lakes in Vilas County, Wisconsin
 List of lakes in Wyoming
 List of lakes of the White Cloud Mountains

Man-made water bodies 

 Lists of canals
 Lists of reservoirs
 List of reservoirs by surface area
 List of reservoirs by volume
 List of dams and reservoirs in Australia
 List of dams and reservoirs in Botswana
 List of dams and reservoirs in Brazil
 List of dams and reservoirs in Canada
 List of dams and reservoirs in China
 List of dams and reservoirs in Cyprus
 List of dams and reservoirs in Czech Republic
 List of dams and reservoirs in Dominican Republic
 List of dams and reservoirs in France
 List of dams and reservoirs in India
 List of dams and reservoirs in Iran
 List of dams and reservoirs in Iraq
 List of dams and reservoirs in Japan
 List of dams and reservoirs in Kyrgyzstan
 Dams and reservoirs in Laos
 List of dams and reservoirs in New Zealand
 List of dams and reservoirs in Nigeria
 List of dams and reservoirs in Pakistan
 List of dams and reservoirs in Poland
 List of dams and reservoirs in Portugal
 List of dams and reservoirs in Romania
 List of dams and reservoirs in Russia
 List of dams and reservoirs in Singapore
 List of dams and reservoirs in Spain
 List of dams and reservoirs in Sri Lanka
 List of dams and reservoirs in Switzerland
 List of dams and reservoirs in Taiwan
 List of dams and reservoirs in Turkey
 List of dams and reservoirs in United Kingdom
 List of dams and reservoirs in United States
 List of dams and reservoirs in Zimbabwe

See also 

 List of countries bordering on two or more oceans
 List of rowing venues
 Lists of waterways

External links 
 Bodies of water vocabulary word list

list